Pendulum is a solo album by German double bassist and composer Eberhard Weber recorded in 1993 and released on the ECM label. Weber uses overdubbing and an echo unit to enhance the sound of his bass.

Reception
The Allmusic review by Scott Yanow awarded the album 4½ stars, stating, "Since he is a strong composer, covering a wide span of moods during this set of melodic originals and avoiding the use of his effects as gimmickry, Weber creates an introverted but accessible program whose appeal should stretch beyond just lovers of bass solos".

Track listing
All compositions by Eberhard Weber
 "Bird Out of Cage" - 5:04  
 "Notes After an Evening" - 4:15  
 "Delirium" - 5:20  
 "Children's Song No. 1" - 5:41  
 "Street Scenes" - 5:26  
 "Silent for a While" - 7:42  
 "Pendulum" - 8:41  
 "Unfinished Self-Portrait" - 4:34  
 "Closing Scene" - 6:36

Personnel
Eberhard Weber - bass
Paul McCandless - wind instruments

References

ECM Records albums
Eberhard Weber albums
1993 albums